Chris Little is a Scottish-born football coach and former player. He is currently an assistant coach for Major League Soccer side Colorado Rapids. He was previously head coach of Tacoma Defiance, the second-division affiliate of Seattle Sounders FC. He played professionally for the Wilmington Hammerheads of the USL Second Division and previously coached various amateur and college teams in North Carolina and Kentucky.

College career
Little was born in Edinburgh, Scotland and raised in the English city of Swindon. He played for the AFC Bournemouth Academy, but left at the age of 18 to pursue a college scholarship at the University of North Carolina at Pembroke. During his four years at UNC Pembroke, he played 58 matches for the Braves as a midfielder and recorded 29 goals and 23 assists. Little captained the Braves for two seasons and was inducted into the university's Athletic Hall Of Fame in 2012. He graduated from UNC Pembroke in 2000 with a bachelor's degree in History and in 2002 with a master's degree in physical education.

Club career

Little was signed to a professional contract with the Wilmington Hammerheads of the USL Second Division in 2000 and became a starting midfielder and forward.

Coaching career

Little returned to UNC Pembroke in 2001 as an assistant coach for two years. He was named the head coach of Cumberland College in 2003 and lead the team to a 20th-place rank in the 2004 NAIA national poll and to the final of the NAIA Region XI tournament. Little returned to North Carolina to manage various youth football organisations in the Greensboro area before accepting a role as assistant coach for the Carolina Dynamo from 2008 to 2009.

Little was named an assistant coach at Elon University in 2010 and was promoted to head coach in 2014 following the departure of Darren Powell. During his tenure at Elon, the team won four conference championships and qualified for three editions of the NCAA Tournament. Little also returned to the Carolina Dynamo as head coach in 2013.

In 2017, Little joined Seattle Sounders FC as an academy coach and trainer. He managed several academy teams to national championships and was named the 2018 U-16/17 U.S. Development Academy West Division Coach of the Year. Little received his Elite Formation Coaching License from Major League Soccer in 2018 and spent time with the training staff of Atlético Madrid under the program. On 23 January 2019 the Sounders announced that Little would take over as head coach of the Tacoma Defiance reserves team while retaining his role as the Sounders FC Academy Director of Coaching.

On 26 February 2021, Little left Tacoma to join Colorado Rapids as an assistant coach.

Personal life

Little is married to Kara-Lyn, a former volleyball player at UNC Pembroke, and has two children.

Honors

Coach 
NC Youth Association
ODP National Tournament: 2006 (shared), 2007

US Academy (U16)
US Soccer National Youth Championships: 2009

Elon Phoenix
SoCon Championship: 2011, 2012 (as assistant)
SoCon Championship Regular Season: 2012 (as assistant)
CAA Championship Regular Season: 2015 (shared)

Individual 
UNCP Most Outstanding Player: 2000
UNCP Athletics Hall of Fame: 2012 Inductee
NSCAA South Region Assistant Coach of the Year: 2012
NSCAA Midwest Region Coach of the Year: 2015

References

Living people
Seattle Sounders FC non-playing staff
Scottish footballers
University of North Carolina at Pembroke alumni
USL Championship coaches
Association football midfielders
Year of birth missing (living people)
Scottish football managers
1970s births
Footballers from Edinburgh
UNC Pembroke Braves men's soccer coaches
Wilmington Hammerheads FC players
USL Second Division players
Scottish expatriate football managers
Scottish expatriate footballers
Scottish expatriate sportspeople in the United States
Cumberlands Patriots coaches
North Carolina Fusion U23
USL League Two coaches
Elon Phoenix men's soccer coaches
Tacoma Defiance coaches
Colorado Rapids non-playing staff